The Ecuadorian records in swimming are the fastest ever performances of swimmers from Ecuador, which are recognised and ratified by the Federation Ecuatoriana de Natation (FEN).

All records were set in finals unless noted otherwise.

Long Course (50 m)

Men

Women

Mixed relay

Short Course (25 m)

Men

Women

Mixed relay

References
General
Ecuadorian Long Course Records – Men 31 December 2021 updated
Ecuadorian Long Course Records – Women 30 June 2021 updated
Ecuadorian Short Course Records – Men 24 December 2021 updated
Ecuadorian Short Course Records – Women 14 May 2022 updated
Specific

External links
FEN web site

Ecuador
Records
Swimming
Swimming